Bekodoka is a town and commune in western Madagascar. It belongs to the district of Besalampy, which is a part of Melaky Region. The population of the commune was estimated to be approximately 10,000 in 2001 commune census.

Only primary schooling is available. The majority 90% of the population of the commune are farmers, while an additional 9% receives their livelihood from raising livestock. The most important crops are rice and raffia palm; also cassava is an important agricultural product. Services provide employment for 1% of the population.

References and notes 

Populated places in Melaky